Ambystomatidae is a family of salamanders belonging to the order Caudata in the class Amphibia. It contains two genera, Ambystoma (the mole salamanders) and Dicamptodon (the Pacific giant salamanders). Ambystoma contains 32 species and are distributed widely across North America, while Dicamptodon contains four species restricted to the Pacific Northwest. These salamanders are mostly terrestrial and eat invertebrates, although some species are known to eat smaller salamanders. They can be found throughout the US and some areas of Canada in damp forests or plains. This family contains some of the largest terrestrial salamanders in the world, the tiger salamander and the coastal giant salamander. Some species are toxic and can secrete poison from their bodies as protection against predators or infraspecific competition. Neoteny has been observed in several species in Ambystomatidae, and some of them like the axolotl live all of their lives under water in their larval stage.

Characteristics and Behavior 
Ambystomatids have chunky bodies with broad, flat heads and short legs. Tails are long and flattened. Colors range from black, brown, or a dull grey and can have brightly colored speckles or spots. Their skin is smooth and shiny. Most adults lack gills/gill slits and moveable eyes. There are no nasolabial grooves on the snout. Lungs are well-developed and functional. They have 10 costal grooves. Adult males have 6 sets of cloacal glands. Adult females have spermathecae in cloaca. Ambystomatids are nocturnal. Although they are more active at night, they may be found on cool days under moist leaf litter, logs, or rocks near water bodies.

Adults tend to live in burrows and only return to waterbodies or streams to breed in early Spring. Fertilization is internal. Courtship occurs in water; males "dance," nudging the females then deposit numerous spermatophores. Most species have a larval period that extends for 3-4 months. Ambystomatids can be found in temperate forests and wetlands.

Taxonomy
The genus Rhyacotriton was formerly included in this family, but is now usually placed into its own family Rhyacotritonidae. In 2006, a large study of amphibian systematics (Frost et al., Bulletin of the American Museum of Natural History, 297 (2006) placed Dicamptodon back within Ambystomatidae, based on cladistic analysis. This has been accepted by the Center for Indian Herpetology.

References 

http://amphibiaweb.org/lists/Ambystomatidae.shtml
http://tolweb.org/Ambystomatidae/15448

External links

Tree of Life: Ambystomatidae

Salamanders
Amphibian families